Lakeland is a federal electoral district in Alberta, Canada, that was represented in the House of Commons of Canada from 1997 to 2004, and again since 2015. Its name is derived from the area's topography (and the former Lakeland County). The district's largest communities are Bonnyville, St. Paul, and the Alberta part of Lloydminster.

History

The district was created in 1996 from the Beaver River and Vegreville ridings. It was abolished in 2003, with parts transferred to Vegreville—Wainwright and Westlock—St. Paul. A small part was transferred to Athabasca.

The riding was re-created in 2013 from these same districts (Athabasca having been renamed to Fort McMurray—Athabasca) with a new set of boundaries, no longer including the northerly communities of Lac La Biche and Cold Lake, but extending further west to the towns of Athabasca and Waskatenau. It is largely a successor to Vegreville—Wainwright.

Demographics
Its 2016 population was 108,451, a 3.7% increase from 2011.

Members of Parliament
This riding has elected the following members of the House of Commons of Canada:

In addition, Senator Martha Bielish designated "Lakeland" as her Senate division, representing the area as a Progressive Conservative from 1979 to 1990. She was Alberta's first female Senator.

Election results

2015–present

1997–2004

See also 

 List of Canadian federal electoral districts
 Past Canadian electoral districts

Notes

References

External links 
 
 Expenditures - 2000
 Expenditures - 1997
 Elections Canada
 Website of the Parliament of Canada

Alberta federal electoral districts
Athabasca, Alberta
Lloydminster
Two Hills, Alberta